Essex and Suffolk Water is a water supply company in the United Kingdom. It operates in two geographically distinct areas, one serving parts of Norfolk and Suffolk, and the other serving parts of Essex and Greater London. The total population served is 1.8 million. Essex and Suffolk is a 'water only' supplier, with sewerage services provided by Anglian Water and Thames Water within its areas of supply. It is part of the Northumbrian Water Group.

History
The South Essex Waterworks Company and the Southend Waterworks Company merged to form the Essex Water Company in 1970. In 1994 the Essex Water Company merged with Suffolk Water Company to form Essex and Suffolk Water. Since 2000 it has been part of Northumbrian Water, but continues to trade under the Essex and Suffolk Water name in the area.

Southend Waterworks Company
The Southend Waterworks Company had its origins in Southend-on-Sea in 1865 when a private undertaking constructed a well in Milton Road. A pumping station pumped the water to a reservoir on Cambridge Road. In 1871, the Southend Waterworks Company Limited was formed, and bought the works. The company became a statutory undertaker in 1879, which restricted the amount of money they could borrow, the profits they could retain and the dividend payable to shareholders, but gave them powers to lay pipes beneath public streets and on private land.

By 1924, the company were supplying an area of  bounded on the south by the River Thames, on the north by the River Crouch, and stretching westwards to the outskirts of Shenfield. As the volume of water required increased, additional wells were sunk, until there were 36 wells or boreholes in operation. They penetrated a layer of London clay near the surface, and continued into the sands of the Lower London tertiary deposits below that, but the yields obtained were generally poor and gradually diminished over time. In 1921 the company started to look at extracting water from rivers, but failed to obtain parliamentary approval for a joint scheme with the South Essex Waterworks Company to obtain water from the River Stour on the border between Essex and Suffolk. They therefore developed a scheme to extract water from the River Blackwater, the River Chelmer and its tributary, the River Ter. An Act of Parliament was obtained in August 1924, to enable construction of Langford Works, to the west of Maldon.

The water flowed by gravity along the pipeline to two sedimentation reservoirs each covering  and capable of holding . Water from the Blackwater intake at Langford Mill is pumped to the sedimentation reservoirs. From there the water flows by gravity to the Langford pumping station. In order to maintain the quality of the water, effluent discharged from the Chelmsford sewage treatment works on the Chelmer and the Witham sewage treatment works on the Blackwater was piped to new outfalls below the intakes.

When built, the Langford pumping station contained two triple-expansion steam engines, with room for a third, which was fitted in 1931. There were used in pairs, and each drove a low lift pump to transfer water to the treatment works, and a high lift pump to take treated water and pump it along a  cast iron pipe to Southend. The pipe crossed below the River Crouch at Hullbridge, where shafts were built on either side of the river, and a tunnel was constructed between them. The water main is formed of twin steel tubes within the tunnel. The Oakwood storage reservoir was constructed in Bramble Crescent, Hadleigh (51°33'53.3"N 0°37'43.4"E). This was supplied with water from Langford, firstly by the 28-inch main and later by an additional 32-inch main. Oakwood (elevation 65 metres) was the main storage reservoir supplying treated water to Southend by gravity. Additional storage reservoirs were added at Oakwood, increasing the capacity to 17 million gallons (77.2 Ml). In August 1927, water from the Chelmer started to be used, and between then and 1945, 96 per cent of the water supplied by Southend Waterworks came from Langford. The wells and boreholes were maintained, to provide a backup supply when necessary.

In 1960, work began on replacing the steam engines at Langford pumping station with semi-automatic electric pumps. The project cost £260,000, and was formally inaugurated on 31 October 1963, when Sir George Chaplin, the Chairman of Essex County Council, switched on the new pumps. In the late 1960s, construction of a new treatment works next to the storage reservoirs began. The works cost £1.5 million, and were opened on 30 June 1970. They can produce  of treated water per day. Earlier that year, the Essex Water Order was passed by Parliament, and on 1 April Southend Waterworks Company amalgamated with South Essex Waterworks Company to become the Essex Water Company. Negotiations between Maldon District Council, Essex and Suffolk Water and other interested parties in 1996 resulted in the Langford pumping station and its one remaining engine, dating from 1931, becoming the fledgling Museum of Power.

South Essex Waterworks Company
The South Essex Waterworks Company was formed in 1861, and supplied drinking water to an area of  stretching from Grays to East Ham and from Brentwood to the River Thames. Water was obtained from boreholes sunk into the chalk aquifer underlying the area, but by the time of the First World War, these supplies were not sufficient to meet the demand for water, and so the company looked further afield. Following the failure of the joint scheme with Southend Waterworks Company, they obtained an Act of Parliament in 1928 for a revised scheme which included a water treatment works at Langham with an intake from the River Stour. Treated water was pumped from the works to Tiptree works, and was pumped from there to a reservoir at Danbury. It then flowed by gravity to another storage reservoir at Herongate and then into the distribution network. One condition of the Act was that the company had to supply water to other local authorities which were outside their original supply area. 

The company obtained another Act of Parliament in 1935 for a second abstraction point on the Stour. Treated water was pumped to Tiptree, where it was blended with water from Langham. When full, it could hold .

Construction of the reservoir began in March 1936 and continued until the start of the Second World War in 1939. To pass under the River Colne, shafts were constructed on either side of the river, and a  diameter tunnel was excavated between the shafts. The miners worked in compressed air, and twin pipes of  diameter were run through the tunnel. A second pipeline of  diameter pipes was subsequently installed. Filling of the reservoir began in 1939 and was completed by the end of 1940. Some minor commissioning work, including the Abberton pumping station, was delayed until the end of hostilities. The project cost £500,000. Many of the construction workers came from Durham, and some stayed on to run the works, including Stanley Aldridge, who had been the Engineer, and became the General Manager of the Layer works.

Joint projects

Although the Southend Waterworks Company and the South Essex Waterworks Company did not formally unite until 1970, they co-operated on two major projects prior to that date. These were the construction of Hanningfield Reservoir and the Ely-Ouse to Essex Transfer Scheme.

The construction of Hanningfield Reservoir, which was authorised by the Hanningfield Water Order 1950, and began in 1951, was a joint venture between the two companies. It was built in the Sandon Valley, to the north of Wickford, and covered the hamlet of Peasdown. A  mass earth dam with a puddle clay core was built across the north-east edge of the site, and a new  pipeline was built from the Langford pumping station to supply the reservoir. The main contractors for the project were W&C French, and it took around 5 years to complete, with the treatment works beginning production in August 1956. The formal opening took place over a year later, when  Henry Brooke, MP, the Minister of Housing and Local Government, performed the ceremony in September 1957. The total cost of the project was £6 million, and when full, the reservoir can hold .

In order to meet the rising demands for water faced by both companies, the next major project was the Ely-Ouse to Essex Transfer Scheme. Surplus water in the River Great Ouse, which would otherwise flow into the sea, was to be diverted via a series of channels, tunnels and pipelines to augment supplies to the Abberton and Hanningfield reservoirs. At the northern end, the Cut Off Channel carries the headwaters of the River Lark, the River Little Ouse and the River Wissey to the Great Ouse at Denver Sluice, when those rivers are in flood. An intake was constructed at Blackdyke, close to the Little Ouse, and a tunnel carries the water to a pumping station at Kennett. From there a  pipeline carries the water to Kirtling Green Outfall, where it enters Kirtling Brook, a tributary of the River Stour. Further down the Stour, some of the water is removed from the river by Wixoe pumping station. A  diameter pipeline carries it to the Great Sampford outfall, where it is discharged into the River Pant, the name of the upper reaches of the River Blackwater. Construction of the scheme was completed in 1971.

Suffolk Water plc
The Great Yarmouth Waterworks Company was set up in 1853, authorised by the Great Yarmouth Waterworks Act of that year. They built a waterworks at Ormesby Broad, from where water flowed by gravity into Great Yarmouth. Two steam engines raised the water up to some filter beds. The construction of the distribution network of pipes through the town was completed in 1855, when the Ormesby Waterworks was opened.

Public water supply in Lowestoft also began in 1853, with the creation of the Lowestoft Water, Gas and Market Company. They retained this name until 1897, when they became the Lowestoft Water and Gas Company. The company had an authorised capital of £25,000, and bought the gas works for £5,000. Water was supplied to a tower at Kirkley from a well at Middle West Field, and subsequently from a lake at Bunkers Hill, Lound. From there it was pumped through a  pipeline to a covered reservoir located to the north of the town.

Both the company and the Great Yarmouth company were finding that the supplies were inadequate for the populations of the two towns, particularly are there was a large seasonal tourist trade, and in 1906, they attempted to get authorisation for extracting water from the River Bure. The bill faced a rough passage through Parliament, as there were objections to parts of it from Norfolk County Council, the Great Yarmouth Corporation, the Great Yarmouth Court Commissioners, the London Drainage Commissioners, the Ecclesiastical Commissioners for England, and some private individuals. The chief concerns were that removing water from the Bure would impede navigation, and that the quality of the water would be poor, and unfit to supply as drinking water. However, the bill eventually became the Great Yarmouth Waterworks and Lowestoft Water and Gas Act 1907.

The two companies amalgamated in 1962 to become the East Anglian Water Company. The merger was sanctioned by the East Anglian Water Order 1962, using the powers of the Water Act 1945. By this time the Lowestoft Water and Gas Company was known as the Lowestoft Water Company, as all gas companies had been nationalised in 1948. A further change of name occurred on 18 January 1991, when it became Suffolk Water plc, and the new company was taken over by Essex Water on 8 April 1994, to become Essex and Suffolk Water. Both were owned by the French company  at the time.

Essex and Suffolk Water
In order to provide improved supplies to Great Yarmouth, the company bought most of the Trinity Broads in 1995. These are isolated from the River Bure by a narrow channel, and have been further protected by the installation of a sluice gate. They were designated as a Site of Special Scientific Interest in 1998. Osmesby Works is situated by the side of Ormesby Broad, and can treat water from the broads. Parts of the works date from the 1930s, and others from the 1950s, but a major upgrade was completed in 2005, to enhance the treatment of water from the broads, which is affected by algal bloom for around a quarter of each year.  

In order to meet long-term supply requirements, the company looked at several options, and in 1997 settled on expanding the capacity of Abberton Reservoir. After ten years of design work and a lengthy tendering process, work began in January 2010 on a project costed at £150 million, to increase the capacity of the reservoir by 58 per cent, and to upgrade the capacity of the Ely-Ouse Essex Transfer Scheme. The original pumping station which pumped water to Layer de la Haye treatment works would have been submerged by the new water levels, and so had to be demolished and rebuilt at a higher level. In order to keep the system operational while this was being done, a temporary pumping station was built on the shore of the reservoir. The new station can deliver  of raw water per day to the works. Other enhancements at the reservoir site included the construction of a new visitor centre for the Essex Wildlife Trust, and work on the B1026 causeway, which crossed the reservoir at a height where it would be below the level of the new water surface.

As part of the upgrade, three additional pumps were installed at Kennett. Around  of new underground pipeline was constructed from Kirtling Green in Suffolk, along the banks of the Stour to Wixoe, where the water discharges into the river. Further down the river, a new pumping station was constructed at Wormingford, to remove the water from the river and pump it to Abberton. Most of the two pipelines were installed using cut and cover techniques, but the southern pipeline passes under the River Colne and beneath the A12 road and the East Coast railway to the west of Colchester. The pipeline was then laid through the tunnel and grouted in. The entire project was completed in 2014.

Supply area
The total population served is 1.8 million, through over 735,000 domestic connections and over 47,000 non-household connections. Essex and Suffolk is a 'water only' supplier, with sewerage services supplied by Anglian Water (Essex, Norfolk, Suffolk and part of Upminster) and Thames Water (Greater London and part of Brentwood).

Bibliography

References

External links

Water companies of England
Companies supplying water and sanitation to London